Sardar Ahmad Chishti Qadri (1903–1962) (Urdu محدث اعظم مولانا سردار احمد چشتی قادری) was a Pakistani Sufi saint, Muhaddis, teacher, jurist, author, Islamic scholar, and debater recognized by his followers as Muhaddis-e-Azam Pakistan.

Family background
Sardar Ahmad Chisti's father was Choudhry Miran Bakhsh Chishti. He was born in Dayal Garh, Gurdaspur district, East Punjab in Arain family on 22 September 1903 (29 Jumada al-Thani 1321 AH). 
His son Sahibzada Muhammad Fazal Karim was a member of the National Assembly of Pakistan NA-82 Faisalabad and founder of Sunni Ittehad Council.

Education and life
He attended primary school in Dialgarh village in Batala and Islamic high school in Batala, matriculating in 1924 (1343 AH). He came to Lahore for the preparation of FA, i.e. two years degree programme, and when he attended a speech of Ahmad Raza Khan in Masjid Wazeer Khan Lahore he decided to join seminary Manzar-e-Islam in Bareilly city.

There he met Hamid Raza Khan, son of Ahmed Raza Khan Barelvi, and decided to join the centre of Islamic sciences and art by abandoning his English education at Manzar-e-Islam at Bareilly. He gained instruction from Mustafa Raza Khan Qadri, Amjad Ali Azmi and Muhammad Husain.

Qadri became leader of Mazhare Islam Bareilly when Amjad Ali left seminary for Dadu district, Aligarh.
Followers and admirers bestowed upon him the title of Muhaddis-e-Azam-e-Pakistan. He headed the Islamic seminary Mazhar-e-Islam Jamia Rizvia in Jhang Bazaar, Faislabad. He was a patron of the All India Sunni Conference and supported the Pakistan movement.

Sufism
He became a disciple of Shah Muhammad Taj-ul-Haq Chishti in the Chishti order and received successorship and teaching licenses from Hamid Raza Khan, Mustafa Raza Khan Qadri and Amjad Ali azmi, who gave him teaching permissions and successorship in all saintly orders. He was a disciple of Ahmad Raza Khan.
His student was Islamic scholar Muhammad Ibrahim Siddiqui, who formed the Sunni Razvi Society in Mauritius. 
He was close to Mohammad Abdul Ghafoor Hazarvi. They had both studied with Hamid Raza Khan.

Rulings
According to one fatwa, a person must wear clothes that cover the parts of the body which must be concealed according to Shari’ah. It is recommended to wear clothes for adornment and to express the blessings of God which he has granted.

Death and shrine
Sardar Ahmad died on 29 December 1962 (1 Sha'ban 1382 AH), and his shrine is in Sunni Rizvi Jamia Masjid Faisalabad city.

Works
By him 
Fataawa-e-Muhaddis-e-Azam published by Maktaba Qadria Faislabad 2001 
Sayyidna Ameer Muawia published by Maktaba Qadariya Faislabad 2018, Pakistan
Shan E Rasool ( Sallallhu Alaihi Wasalam) Bazuban E Fana Fil Rasool published by Bazm-e-Raza-e-Mustafa Pakistan
Islami Qanoon-e-Wirasat or Law of Inheritancein Islam published by Maktaba Qadariya Faislabad, Pakistan 
Tabsara-o-Mazhabi about Allama Mashriqi
Radee-Mirzayiyat, Refutation of Ghulam Ahmad Qadiyani

About him
Mohaddise Azam Pakistan- Maulana Muhammada Sardar Ahmad Chishti Qadri by Saeed Jalal-ul-Deen,published by Maktaba Qadria Faislabad 2012

See also
Baba Lasoori Shah
Baba Noor Shah Wali
Baba Qaim Sain
Barkat Ali Ludhianwi

References

Sufi mystics
Pakistani Sufis
People from Faisalabad
Punjabi Sufi saints
Sufi shrines in Pakistan
1903 births
1962 deaths
Pakistani Sunni Muslim scholars of Islam
Hanafis
Barelvis
Sunni imams
Chishtis